Pukara (Quechua for fortress, Hispanicized spelling Pucará) is a mountain in the Cusco Region in Peru, about  high. It is situated in the Paucartambo Province, Challabamba District, west of Challabamba.

References 

Mountains of Peru
Mountains of Cusco Region